Juliet Kyinyamatama Suubi (born 22 December 1988) is a Ugandan politician and  member of parliament. In 2011, she was elected as a district woman representative in the parliament for Rakai district, re-elected for the second term in office in the 2016 Uganda General elections and for the 3rd term in office in the 2021 Uganda General elections.

She campaigned as an independent political candidate after losing in the National Resistance Movement primaries.

Education 
She completed her primary level education in 2001 at Ronald Ruta primary school in Lyantonde. In 2005 she completed her Uganda Certificate of Education (UCE) for lower secondary education at Valley College located in Bushenyi, where she completed her advanced secondary level known as Uganda Advanced Certification of Education (UACE) in 2008. In 2012 she graduated from Uganda Christian University with a Bachelor's degree of Social Work and Social Administration. She attained a certificate in Global Health from University of Geneva in 2013 .

Other responsibilities

See also 

 Independent politician
 Rakai district
 List of members of the ninth Parliament of Uganda
 List of members of the tenth Parliament of Uganda
 List of members of the eleventh Parliament of Uganda
 Member of Parliament
 Parliament of Uganda

References

External links 

 Website of the Parliament of Uganda

Women members of the Parliament of Uganda
Members of the Parliament of Uganda
Rakai District
Uganda Christian University alumni
21st-century Ugandan women politicians
21st-century Ugandan politicians
1988 births
Living people